David Rogers is an American film editor, television director and producer best known for working on NewsRadio, Entourage, The Office, and Space Force. In 2007, he was honored with the Primetime Emmy Award for Outstanding Single-Camera Picture Editing for a Comedy Series for his work on The Office's  third season finale, "The Job", which he shared with Dean Holland and another Emmy for the series finale, "Finale", which he shared with Claire Scanlon.

Professional background 
Rogers began his career as an assistant editor on a variety of sitcoms throughout the mid-to-late 1990s and into the 2000s. These shows included The Single Guy, Seinfeld, Oh, Grow Up and NewsRadio. He first worked as a senior editor on the Seinfeld episode The Clip Show in 1998. Since then he has edited on comedies such as NewsRadio, The O'Keefes, The Comeback and Entourage. Since 2005 has edited more than forty episodes of The Office. At the beginning of the sixth season, Rogers became an associate producer on the series. He attained the rank of co-producer beginning with seventh season.

Filmography

References

External links 

American television directors
Emmy Award winners
Living people
American television editors
Place of birth missing (living people)
Year of birth missing (living people)
American film editors